Paul Land (December 19, 1853 – March 1, 1919)  was an American politician in the state of Washington. He served in the Washington State Senate  and Washington House of Representatives.

References

Politicians from Hamilton, Ontario
Democratic Party members of the Washington House of Representatives
Democratic Party Washington (state) state senators
1853 births
1919 deaths
19th-century American politicians